The Legislative Assembly of the Northern Territory is the unicameral legislature of the Northern Territory of Australia. The Legislative Assembly has 25 members, each elected in single-member electorates for four-year terms. The voting method for the Assembly is the full-preferential voting system, having previously been optional preferential voting. Elections are on the fourth Saturday in August of the fourth year after the previous election, but can be earlier in the event of a no confidence vote in the Government. The most recent election for the Legislative Assembly was the 2020 election held on 22 August 2020. The next election is scheduled for 24 August 2024.

Persons who are qualified under the Commonwealth Electoral Act 1918 to vote for a member for the Northern Territory in the House of Representatives are qualified to vote at an election for the Legislative Assembly. Voting is compulsory for all those over 18 years of age. Since 2004, elections have been conducted by the Northern Territory Electoral Commission, which also organises regular electoral redistributions.

Current distribution of seats
, the current distribution of seats is:

One seat is vacant due to the death of Lawrence Costa on 18 December 2022.
 13 votes as a majority are required to pass legislation.

Powers

In 1978, the Northern Territory was granted limited self-government by the Northern Territory (Administration) Act 1974 (Cth), an act of the Australian federal parliament. The federal government retains control of certain legislative areas, including Aboriginal land, industrial relations, national parks and uranium mining. For inter-governmental financial purposes the Northern Territory has been regarded by the Commonwealth as a State since 1 July 1988.

All questions arising in the Assembly are determined by a majority of votes and the Speaker, or other member presiding, is also entitled to vote. Where there is an equality of votes the Speaker, or other member presiding, shall have a casting vote.

Legislation passed by the Assembly requires assent by the Administrator of the Northern Territory, acting on the advice of the Government, a practice analogous to the royal assent of an Australian state governor. Under Australian constitutional practice, assent is usually a formality. After the Administrator gives assent, the Governor-General of Australia also has the power to reject a law on the advice of the Prime Minister of Australia and the federal Cabinet, but this power has also been only rarely exercised. The federal government also retains power to legislate for the Territory in all matters, including the right to override legislation passed by the Assembly.

The party or coalition with the most seats in the Assembly is invited by the Administrator to form government. The leader of that party subsequently becomes the Chief Minister of the Northern Territory, and their senior colleagues become ministers responsible for various portfolios. As Australian political parties traditionally vote along party lines, most legislation introduced by the party commanding a majority will pass through the Legislative Assembly.

History

The Northern Territory Legislative Assembly was created in 1974 by the Northern Territory (Administration) Act 1974 (Cth), an act of the Australian federal parliament, which replaced the partly elected Legislative Council. The Legislative Assembly consisted of 19 fully elected members, but initially lacked significant powers, until limited self-government was granted in 1978. For the 1983 election, the number of members was increased to 25.

From its inception prior to the 1974 election until the 2001 election, the Legislative Assembly was controlled by the conservative Country Liberal Party, which since 1979 has been affiliated with the federal Liberal–National coalition. In 2001, the Labor Party won a one-seat majority, and Clare Martin became the Territory's first Labor and first female chief minister. At the 2005 election, the Martin-led ALP won 19 seats to the CLP's 4; however, Martin resigned in 2007 and was succeeded by Paul Henderson as ALP leader, and retained government with another one-seat majority at the 2008 election. Labor lost its majority when Marion Scrymgour went to the cross-benches as an independent. She re-joined the party after Alison Anderson left the party to sit as an independent. Anderson joined the CLP in September 2011. The 2012 election resulted in the return of the CLP under Terry Mills with 16 seats to the ALP's 8. Mills resigned in 2013 and Adam Giles became CLP leader. The CLP was reduced to a one-seat majority in 2014 when three CLP members defected to join the Palmer United Party. One defector later rejoined the CLP. After further defections, CLP numbers fell to minority government status in July 2015.

The 2016 election saw a landslide CLP defeat which brought Labor to power led by Chief Minister Michael Gunner. The position of Speaker of the Northern Territory Legislative Assembly was held by CLP-turned-independent MP Kezia Purick from 23 October 2012. Despite Labor's massive majority following the 2016 election, the incoming Labor government re-appointed Purick as Speaker. Following an ICAC investigation into allegations Kezia Purick had engaged in corrupt conduct, she resigned, and the role was filled by Chansey Paech on 23 June 2020. Following the 2020 election, Paech resigned in September 2020 to serve as a minister in Gunner's cabinet, and Ngaree Ah Kit was acting speaker for a month until her substantive election on 20 October 2020.

Chan Contemporary Artspace

Chan Contemporary Artspace is an exhibition gallery located in Darwin, Northern Territory, Australia. It is located in a former administrative building and home of the Northern Territory Legislative Assembly. For five years between 2010 and 2014 the Chan was the site of a changing exhibition program featuring works from local and regional contemporary artists auspiced through the Northern Centre for Contemporary Art. In 2015 the Northern Territory government announced a major refit and extension of facilities there for the site to be redeveloped as a second facility for the Museum and Art Gallery of the Northern Territory.

History 
The Chan Building was part of a series of administrative structures built in Darwin in the post-war period. Between 1990 and the end of 1994, the building was the home of the Northern Territory Legislative Assembly while the current Parliament House was under construction. The building was then used for a variety of purposes and in 1999 underwent a major refit of $1.4m when Darwin hosted APEC 2000. In 2010 the Northern Territory government announced that the site would become the location of a contemporary art gallery. In the 2015 Budget the Northern Territory government announced a dedicated visual art gallery in Darwin's historic Chan Building with a proposed budget of $18.3m sourced from a combination of government and private sources featuring gallery space, cafe and retail space. It is intended that the space become the second campus of the existing Museum and Art Gallery of the Northern Territory at Bullocky Point showcasing contemporary art while the Bullocky Point facility remains a centre for science and history.

See also
 2020 Northern Territory general election
 Parliaments of the Australian states and territories
 Members of the Northern Territory Legislative Assembly
 Northern Territory ministries
 List of museums in the Northern Territory
 List of Northern Territory by-elections

Notes

References

External links
 Northern Territory Legislative Assembly

Parliament of the Northern Territory
1974 establishments in Australia
Museums in the Northern Territory